Bondarzewia podocarpi is a species of polypore fungus in the family Russulaceae. Described as new to science in 2010, it is found in Hainan, China, where it grows parasitically on Podocarpus imbricatus.

References

External links

Fungi described in 2010
Fungi of China
Russulales
Taxa named by Bao-Kai Cui
Taxa named by Yu-Cheng Dai